Eric Douglas Ebersole (born May 20, 1958) is an American politician who serves as a Delegate to the Maryland General Assembly representing District 44B. From 2015 to 2023, he represented the 12th District.

Early life and career 
Ebersole was born in Baltimore, Maryland on May 20, 1958, and grew up in Catonsville. He attended the University of Maryland, College Park, earning a B.S. degree in mathematics education in 1980 and an M.S. degree in the same field in 1986.

After graduating, Ebersole worked for more than three decades as a high school math teacher in Howard County, at Wilde Lake, Marriotts Ridge, and Reservoir High Schools. He also served as an adjunct instructor in mathematics education at the University of Maryland, Baltimore County. Among the awards Ebersole won during his time as a teacher was his selection as Outstanding Secondary Mathematics Teachers of the Year in 1987 by the Maryland Council of Teachers of Mathematics and his selection as Wilde Lake High School's Teacher of the Year in 2002.

In addition to his work as a classroom teacher, Ebersole was actively involved in a number of professional and community organizations. He was a member of the Maryland Council of Teachers of Mathematics and served in a number of leadership roles in that organization. In addition he volunteered with the Catonsville Chamber of Commerce, is a life member of the Catonsville Historical Society, and served in a number of leadership roles in the Catonsville Presbyterian Church.

Following redistricting in 2010, the three incumbent legislators representing District 12, which had formerly been divided into two sub-districts, chose not to run for re-election. Ebersole ran for the seat in a crowded primary field, and was elected alongside Terri L. Hill and Clarence K. Lam as an all-freshman delegation to the General Assembly.

In the legislature
Ebersole was sworn into the Maryland House of Delegates on January 14, 2015. Since 2022, he has served as Deputy Majority Whip. He has filed to run for re-election in 2022.

In October 2015, Speaker of the Maryland House of Delegates Michael E. Busch appointed Ebersole to a commission to study the use of standardized testing in the state's public schools. The commission submitted its final recommendations, which included reducing the length and testing units for the PARCC test and giving assessments during regular class time, on July 7, 2016.

Committee assignments
 Member, Ways and Means Committee, 2015- (education subcommittee, 2015-; election law subcommittee, 2015–17; revenues subcommittee, 2017–18; chair, finance resources subcommittee, 2019, member, 2015–19; chair, early childhood subcommittee, 2020-)
 Joint Committee on Children, Youth, and Families, 2015-

Other memberships
 House Chair, Howard County Delegation, 2017–18
 Member, Maryland Legislative Transit Caucus, 2019-

Political positions

Education
Ebersole introduced legislation in the 2015 legislative session that would create a commission to survey and assess how much time is spent on testing in each grade level and each school system. The bill passed and became law on May 12, 2015.

Ebersole introduced legislation in the 2019 legislative session that would require the appointment of a full-time teacher and parent of a public school student to the Maryland State Board of Education. The bill passed and became law without Governor Larry Hogan's signature on May 28, 2019.

Ebersole introduced legislation in the 2021 legislative session that would require the Maryland State Department of Education to keep track of the number of students restrained or placed in seclusion. The  bill unanimously passed the House of Delegates. He later introduced legislation in the 2022 legislative session that would ban the use of seclusion in public Maryland schools. The bill passed and became law on April 9, 2022.

Endorsements
Ebersole endorsed former Secretary of State Hillary Clinton for president on November 17, 2015. Ebersole endorsed Ben Jealous for Governor of Maryland on August 8, 2018.

Immigration
In July 2019, Ebersole attended and spoke at a rally outside the office of U.S. Representative Elijah Cummings to urge Cummings to protest against the immigration policy of Donald Trump.

Social issues
Ebersole introduced legislation in the 2021 legislative session that would require school systems to allow students to participate in peaceful demonstrations. The bill passed the House of Delegates by a vote of 97-39.

Electoral history

References 

1958 births
Living people
Democratic Party members of the Maryland House of Delegates
21st-century American politicians